Idelinellidae is a family of fossil cockroach-like insects. They closely resemble members of the family Stenoneuridae, and consist of the following species:
Idelinella macroptera Storozhenko, 1997 – Guadalupian|Middle Permian]], Russia
Permostriga augustalis Novokshonov, 1999 – Lower Permian, Ural Mountains
Sylvastriga miranda Aristov, 2004 – Lower Permian, Ural Mountains
Strigulla cuculiophora (Aristov, 2002) – Lower Permian, Ural Mountains
Cucullistriga cucullata Aristov & Rasnitsyn, 2012 – Lower Permian, Ural Mountains
Scutistriga scutata Aristov & Rasnitsyn, 2012 – Lower Permian, Ural Mountains
Permeoblatta borealis Rasnitsyn & Aristov, 2010 – Upper Permian, Russia
?Rasstriga americana Aristov & Rasnitsyn, 2012 – Upper Carboniferous, Mazon Creek, United States; tentatively included in the family

References

Permian insects
Cisuralian first appearances
Lopingian extinctions